Gazeta was a tabloid daily newspaper published in Belgrade, Serbia.

Beginning publication on October 22, 2007, it was edited by Antonije Kovačević who previously performed the same position at rival Kurir daily tabloid.

The publication couldn't keep up financially, and on October 31, 2008, it was announced by its editor-in-chief Kovacevic that the November 1st issue would be the last.

References

Defunct newspapers published in Serbia
Publications established in 2007
Publications disestablished in 2008
Mass media in Belgrade